The Star Bank LPGA Classic was a golf tournament on the LPGA Tour from 1994 to 2001. It was played at the Country Club of the North in Beavercreek, Ohio. During most of its existence, it was sponsored by either Star Banc Corporation or its corporate successor Firstar Corporation.

Winners
LPGA Champions Classic
2001 Wendy Doolan

Firstar LPGA Classic
2000 Annika Sörenstam
1999 Rosie Jones

Star Bank LPGA Classic
1998 Meg Mallon
1997 Colleen Walker
1996 Laura Davies
1995 Christa Johnson

Children's Medical Center LPGA Classic
1994 Maggie Will

References

Former LPGA Tour events
Golf in Ohio
Beavercreek, Ohio
Recurring sporting events established in 1994
Recurring sporting events disestablished in 2001
1994 establishments in Ohio
2001 disestablishments in Ohio
History of women in Ohio